The Farmers' Holiday Association was a movement of Midwestern United States farmers who, during the Great Depression, endorsed the withholding of farm products from the market, in essence creating a farmers' holiday from work. The Farmers' Holiday Association was organized in May 1932 by Milo Reno. The group urged farmers to declare a "holiday" from farming, with a slogan of "Stay at Home-Buy Nothing-Sell Nothing"  and "Lets call a Farmer's Holiday, a Holiday let's hold.  We'll eat our wheat and ham and eggs, And let them eat their gold".

Farmers went to extreme measures to ensure that their wants were carried through. One person was killed when the farmers began to blockade roads, and other farmers rallied to destroy their crops, reducing supply, and raising prices.  The highways into Sioux City and Council Bluffs, Iowa, were blocked by pickets who dumped farm produce on the side of the road. At Le Mars, Iowa some farmers dragged a judge out of his courtroom, placed a noose around his neck, and threatened to hang him unless he stopped approving farm foreclosures. The striking farmers were countered by  sheriffs, militia, and vigilante groups.

Farmers' Holiday Association activity subsided by 1934.

See also
Iowa Cow War
1933 Wisconsin milk strike
Damnation (TV series)
Aaron Sapiro
National Farmers Organization
Milk quota
Supply management (Canada)
Market Sharing Quota
Producerism

References

Cohen, Adam: Nothing to Fear: "FDR's Inner Circle and the Hundred Days that Created Modern America" New York, The Penguin Press, 2009. Pg. 125

Further reading
 Shover, John L. "The Farmers' Holiday Association Strike, August 1932," Agricultural History (1965) 39#4 pp 196–203. in JSTOR
Luoma, Everett E.: The Farmer Takes A Holiday.  Exposition Press, 1967.
Stock, Catherine McNichol: Rural Radicals: Righteous Rage in the American Grain. Ithaca, NY: Cornell University Press, 1996.
Corcoran, James: Bitter Harvest, Gordon Kahl and the Posse Comitatus: Murder in the Heartland. New York: Penguin, 1990.

Farmers' organizations
Riots and civil disorder in Iowa
Great Depression in the United States
Agricultural organizations based in the United States